Ruzhintsi Municipality is a municipality (obshtina) in Vidin Province, Northwestern Bulgaria, located in the Danubian Plain about 8 km south of Danube river. It is named after its administrative centre - the village of Ruzhintsi.

The main road E79 crosses the southern parts of the area, connecting the province centre of Vidin with the city of Montana and respectively with the western operating part of Hemus motorway.

Settlements 

Ruzhintsi Municipality includes the following 10 places all of them villages:

Demography 
The following table shows the change of the population during the last four decades.

Religion
According to the latest Bulgarian census of 2011, the religious composition, among those who answered the optional question on religious identification, was the following:

An overwhelming majority of the population of Ruzhintsi Municipality identify themselves as Christians. At the 2011 census, 82.8% of respondents identified as Orthodox Christians belonging to the Bulgarian Orthodox Church.

See also
Provinces of Bulgaria
Municipalities of Bulgaria
List of cities and towns in Bulgaria

References

External links
 Info website 

Municipalities of Vidin Province